Lithuanian National Philharmonic Society is a concert agency headquartered in Vilnius, Lithuania. Established in 1940 as State Philharmonic of the Lithuanian SSR, it has operated continuously since then with the exception of 1943. The society was designated a national cultural institution in July 1998.

Currently, the society organizes festivals in Lithuania, including the Vilnius Festival, Nakties Serenados (Night Serenades) in Palanga, and the Kuršių Nerija in Neringa, along with concert series in Nida, Juodkrantė, and Palanga. Among the musical agencies it works with are the  Lithuanian National Symphony Orchestra, the M.K. Čiurlionis String Quartet, the Vilnius String Quartet, and chamber music. Its international activities include the sponsorship of concerts abroad and those of visiting musicians and orchestras, music exchange programs, and membership in EFA (European Festivals Association), ISPA (International Society of Performing Arts), Nordic-Baltic Association of State Concert Institutions, and PEARLE (European League of the Performing Arts Employers' Association).

The Society's headquarters are a historic building in Vilnius Old Town, which previously was used to hold the Great Seimas of Vilnius in 1905. Performances are held in its Concert Hall and Chamber Hall.

Selected recordings

 Camille Sain-Saëns, Piano concerto n°5, Mūza Rubackyté piano, the Lithuanian National Philharmonic Orchestra, conducted by Hanns Martin Schneidt and Piano concerto n°2 (conducted by Alain Pâris). Live record. CD Doron music 2014

References

External links

 Official website

1940 establishments in Lithuania
Performing groups established in 1940
Music organizations based in Lithuania